Daleyville is an unincorporated community located in the town of Perry, Dane County, Wisconsin, United States.

History

The small village got its name from Onon B. Dahle, who opened a store there in 1853. In early history the community's name was spelled “Dahleville.” Daleyville once had two blacksmith shops, a wagon shop, a post office, a shoe shop, a garage and general store, a physician and a surgeon, a telephone exchange, and a school. The Onon B. and Betsy Dahle House still stands just off Highway 78 and is on the National Register of Historic Places.

Notable people
Herman Dahle, member of the United States House of Representatives from Wisconsin

Notes

Unincorporated communities in Dane County, Wisconsin
Unincorporated communities in Wisconsin
Populated places established in 1853
1853 establishments in Wisconsin